Felipe Olivares Rojas (1905 - date of death unknown) was a Mexican football forward who made one appearance for the Mexico national team at the 1930 FIFA World Cup. He was also part of Mexico's squad for the football tournament at the 1928 Summer Olympics, but he did not play in any matches.

References

External links

Mexican footballers
Mexico international footballers
1930 FIFA World Cup players
1905 births
Year of death missing
Association football forwards
Footballers at the 1928 Summer Olympics
Olympic footballers of Mexico